The Ashley and Bailey Company Silk Mill, also known as the Franklin Silk Mill and Leinhardt Brothers Furniture Warehouse, is an historic silk mill which is located in West York, York County, Pennsylvania. It was added to the National Register of Historic Places (NRHP) in 1991 as an example of vernacular industrial architecture. 

Another Ashley and Bailey Silk Mill is located about eighteen miles east in Marietta, Pennsylvania. Built about two years before the West York mill, it was similarly constructed and has also been listed on the NRHP.

History and architectural features
Built circa 1899, this historic factory building is a three-story, brick structure that was erected atop a rough-cut stone foundation. It has a shallow gable roof, a three-story "L"-shaped tower, and a broad one-story ell. Also located on the property is a small, flat-roofed brick building that was built circa 1925.  

The mill closed in 1937. The building was used as a furniture warehouse into the 1980s. 

It was added to the National Register of Historic Places (NRHP) in 1991 as an example of vernacular industrial architecture. 

Another Ashley and Bailey Silk Mill is located about eighteen miles east in Marietta, Pennsylvania. Built about two years before the West York mill, it was similarly constructed and has also been listed on the NRHP.

References

Industrial buildings and structures on the National Register of Historic Places in Pennsylvania
Industrial buildings completed in 1899
Buildings and structures in York County, Pennsylvania
Silk mills in the United States
1937 disestablishments in Pennsylvania
1899 establishments in Pennsylvania
National Register of Historic Places in York County, Pennsylvania